Mikael Norberg (born 20 October 1966 in Sundsvall) is a Swedish curler.

Norberg started playing curling in 1978. He plays in third position as a vice skip and is right-handed.

In 2003 he was inducted into the Swedish Curling Hall of Fame.

References

External links
 

Living people
1966 births
People from Sundsvall
Swedish male curlers
Swedish curling champions
Sportspeople from Västernorrland County